Tupac Amaru Hunter (born July 25, 1973) is an American politician who is a former member of the Michigan Senate, representing the 5th district which encompasses northwest Detroit, Dearborn Heights and Inkster. He served as the Minority Floor Leader.

Background
Tupac A. Hunter was born and raised in Detroit. He graduated from the University of Detroit Jesuit High School and Academy in 1991. In 1995, he earned a Bachelor of Arts Degree in Urban Studies and Public Policy from Morehouse College in Atlanta, Georgia. He also holds a Master of Public Administration Degree from Oakland University.

Political career
In November 2010, Tupac A. Hunter was re-elected to a second term in the Michigan Senate representing the citizens of the 5th District, which comprises northwest Detroit, Dearborn Heights, and Inkster. He was unanimously elected by his colleagues to serve as the Minority Floor Leader for the 2011-14 legislative session. He previously served as the Assistant Minority Leader during his first term in the Michigan Senate (2007–2010). Prior to being elected to the Michigan Senate, he served in the Michigan House of Representatives (2003–2006) where he was the Minority Whip (2005–2006).

Issues
Senator Hunter's legislative interests covered banking and financial services, consumer protection, criminal justice, economic development, education, ethics in government, and health care insurance reform.  His legislative agenda has produced 27 Public Acts and one constitutional amendment to date. He sponsored legislation to encourage financial literacy and fair lending practices; fought for the passage of Michigan's law mandating smoke-free workplaces; and advocated for policies relating to children's health, including legislation that would require insurance companies to cover treatments for children with autism spectrum disorders.

Honors and recognition
The Michigan Chronicle 40 Under 40 Honoree (2013)
Michigan Association of State and Federal Program Specialists Roberta Stanley Legislative Award (2010)
Autism Insurance for Michigan Coalition Legislative Champion Award (2010)
American Heart Association Heart Champion Award (2010)
Hearing Loss Association of Michigan Legislator of the Year Award (2009)
Michigan Deaf Association Legislator of the Year Award (2009)
Michigan Children’s Trust Fund Seasoned Advocate Award (2008)
Michigan Credit Union League Legislator of the Year Award (2007)
Who’s Who in Black Detroit Honoree (2006–2010)

Electoral history

References

External links
Senator Tupac A. Hunter - official government website
Project Vote Smart - Senator Tupac A. Hunter (MI) profile
Follow the Money - Tupac A. Hunter
2006 2004 2002
Michigan Senate Democratic Caucus
Michigan Liberal - SD05

1973 births
African-American state legislators in Michigan
Autism activists
Living people
Members of the Michigan House of Representatives
Michigan state senators
Oakland University alumni
University of Detroit Jesuit High School and Academy alumni
21st-century African-American people
20th-century African-American people
21st-century American politicians